Roger Fenwick (1632–1658) was an English lieutenant-colonel in the New Model Army who was mortally wounded while leading his regiment at the Battle of the Dunes (1658).

Biography
Fenwick was born on 18 March 1632. He was the son of Edward Fenwick of Staunton and his wife Sarah Nevill of Cheat, Yorkshire.

He was Lieutenant-Colonel of Lockhart's New Model Army regiment at the battle of the Dunes fought on 4/14 July 1658. He led Lockhart's regiment in an attack up the  dune (sand-hill) which was defended by veteran Spanish soldiers, and the sides of which were so steep that attacking English had to scramble up on hands and knees. The English after two volleys and push of pike managed to drive the Spanish from the hill and then pursued them down the far side. They were then in turn attacked by cavalry who were unable to break the English formation and were themselves then driven off by French cavalry. All but two of the officers in the regiment that took part in the storming of the sand-hill were killed or wounded with Captain Henry Jones who had volunteered to accompany the regiment into battle taken prisoner.  The performance of the Regiment won the English Army renown throughout Europe. A contemporary newspaper reported that:

Literature
In his A poem on the death of his late Highness the Lord Protector, Andrew Marvell mentions Fenwick and the battle of the Dunes suggesting the victory was gained with the help of the Lord Protector Oliver Cromwell's prayers:
And where the shady mountain Fenwick scaled.
The sea between, yet hence his prayer prevailed.

Notes

References
 

 
 
 
 

1632 births
1658 deaths
Roundheads